Marchessault is a surname. Notable people with the surname include:

Janine Marchessault, Canadian academic
Jonathan Marchessault (born 1990), Canadian ice hockey player
Jovette Marchessault (1938–2012), Canadian writer and artist